is a Japanese voice actress and singer. She is part of the Music Ray'n agency. After passing an audition held by Music Ray'n, she made her voice acting debut as Yumi in the anime My Little Monster. She played her first main role as Ayumi Otosaka in the anime television series Charlotte. She is a member of the voice acting unit TrySail, alongside Sora Amamiya and Shiina Natsukawa. Apart from voice acting, she also performed theme song for various anime she acted in.

Biography
Asakura's interest in becoming a voice actress began in middle school and continued through high school. She got her break in 2011 when, together with Sora Amamiya and Shiina Natsukawa, passed an audition held by Sony Music Entertainment Japan's sub-label Music Ray'n. She made her voice acting debut in 2012, voicing the character Yumi in the anime My Little Monster. Since then, she was given minor roles in various anime.

In 2014, she was cast as Sumi Otokawa in Sakura Trick, Rin Kazari in Witch Craft Works. She and other cast members performed the series' ending theme "Witch☆Activity". On December 21, 2014, it was announced that Asakura, Amamiya, and Natsukawa would be forming the voice acting unit TrySail, which released its first single "Youthful Dreamer", used as the opening theme song for the anime television series Ultimate Otaku Teacher, on May 13, 2015. That same year, she was cast as Ayumi Otosaka in the anime television series Charlotte becoming her first main role. She then played the role of Manako in Monster Musume, and Yuyu Aizawa in Aria the Scarlet Ammo AA.

In 2016, she made her official debut as a solo artist for Music Ray'n by releasing her first single  which was used as an insert song for the anime film Suki ni Naru Sono Shunkan o: Kokuhaku Jikkō Iinkai. The song peak at number 8 on the Oricon weekly charts. Her first solo album Peachy! was released on October 3, 2018; the album peaked at number 6 on the Oricon weekly charts. The following year, she was cast as Rona Pricipa O'Lapanesta in Endro!, and Nagisa Kashiwagi in Kaguya-sama: Love Is War.

Filmography

Anime

Films

Video games

Discography

Albums

Singles

References

External links 
  
  
  
 
  at Oricon 

1994 births
Living people
Anime singers
Japanese women pop singers
Japanese video game actresses
Japanese voice actresses
Musicians from Fukuoka Prefecture
Voice actresses from Fukuoka Prefecture
21st-century Japanese actresses
21st-century Japanese singers
21st-century Japanese women singers